Fiquet is a French surname. Notable people with the surname include:

Alphonse Fiquet (1841–1916), French politician
Marie-Hortense Fiquet (1850–1922), French artists' model

French-language surnames